Silver carbonate is the chemical compound with the formula Ag2CO3. This salt is yellow but typical samples are grayish due to the presence of elemental silver. It is poorly soluble in water, like most transition metal carbonates.

Preparation and reactions
Silver carbonate can be prepared by combining aqueous solutions of sodium carbonate with a deficiency of silver nitrate.
2 AgNO3(aq) + Na2CO3(aq) -> Ag2CO3(s) + 2 NaNO3(aq)
Freshly prepared silver carbonate is colourless, but the solid quickly turns yellow.

Silver carbonate reacts with ammonia to give the diamminesilver(I) ([Ag(NH3)2]+) complex ion. Like other diamminesilver(I) solutions, including Tollen's reagent, there is a possibility that explosive Silver nitride may precipitate out of the solution. Silver nitride was previously known as fulminating silver but due to confusions with silver fulminate it has been discontinued by the IUPAC.

With hydrofluoric acid, it gives silver fluoride.

The thermal conversion of silver carbonate to silver metal proceeds via formation of silver oxide:
Ag2CO3 -> Ag2O  +  CO2
2 Ag2O ->4 Ag + O2

Uses
The principal use of silver carbonate is for the production of silver powder for use in microelectronics.  It is reduced with formaldehyde, producing silver free of alkali metals:
Ag2CO3 + CH2O -> 2 Ag + 2 CO2 + H2

Silver carbonate is used as a reagent in organic synthesis such as the Koenigs-Knorr reaction. In the Fétizon oxidation, silver carbonate on celite serves as an oxidising agent to form keto alcohols from diols. It is also employed to convert alkyl bromides into alcohols.  As a base, it has been used in the Wittig reaction. and in C-H bond activation.

References

External links

Silver compounds
Carbonates